Coffee Break is an online book on the NCBI Bookshelf created and maintained by staff at NCBI, a branch of the National Institutes of Health. The book consists of small chapters which are each written about a different topic in the world of Biomedicine. There are currently 41 chapters, and it was last updated October 2014.

External links 
Table of Contents of Coffee Break

National Institutes of Health
Ebooks